The 2002 Stanley Cup Finals was the championship series of the National Hockey League's (NHL) 2001–02 season, and the culmination of the 2002 Stanley Cup playoffs. It was contested by the Western Conference champion Detroit Red Wings and the Eastern Conference champion Carolina Hurricanes. It was Carolina's first appearance in the Finals in franchise history. Detroit defeated Carolina in five games to win their tenth Stanley Cup championship in franchise history. 

The Red Wings became the first team in NHL history to win the Cup after starting the playoffs with two losses at home. After losing the first two games in the Conference Quarterfinals to the Vancouver Canucks, the Red Wings won 16 of their next 21 games en route to win their third Cup since  for coach Scotty Bowman. It was the last Detroit championship to feature members of the Russian Five, as Sergei Fedorov and Igor Larionov were still with the team.

Paths to the Finals

Carolina defeated the New Jersey Devils, the Canadiens, and the Toronto Maple Leafs in six games apiece to advance to the Finals.

Detroit defeated the Vancouver Canucks 4–2, the St. Louis Blues 4–1 and the defending Cup champion Colorado Avalanche 4–3 to advance to the Finals.

Game summaries
This was the first appearance in the Stanley Cup Finals for the Hurricanes (formerly the Hartford Whalers), who made an unlikely run to the Cup. While they were seeded third as a division winner, they actually had the second-lowest point total (91) for a playoff team not only in the Eastern Conference, but also the whole NHL (ahead of only Montreal). In their whole NHL history, they had only won one playoff series prior to this season (as the Whalers in 1986), and had streaks of five and six seasons in which they did not make the playoffs. As the Red Wings won the Presidents' Trophy with 116 points, the 25-point differential was the largest between two teams in a Stanley Cup Finals since  (27 points between New York Rangers (112) and the Canucks (85)).

The Hurricanes stunned the Red Wings in the first game on the strength of Ron Francis's overtime goal. That would be Carolina's only win in the series as the Red Wings won four straight, including a triple overtime win in game three. The Cup win was the first for many veterans on the team, including goaltender Dominik Hasek, forward Luc Robitaille, and defencemen Steve Duchesne (who retired after this season) and Fredrik Olausson.

Game one

Game one summary
First period:
Scoring:
 1. DETROIT FEDOROV (YZERMAN) 15:21 (PPG)
Penalties:
 Hedican (Car) (high-sticking) 8:03, Robitaille (Det) (tripping) 10:28, Hill (Car) (tripping) 11:15, Wesley (Car) (interference) 15:03.
Second period:
Scoring:
 2. CAROLINA HILL (KAPANEN, FRANCIS) 3:30 (PPG)
3. DETROIT MALTBY (McCARTY) 10:39
4. CAROLINA O'NEILL (WARD) 19:10
Penalties:
Carolina bench (too many men) 0:34, Larionov (Det) (high-sticking) 2:07, Draper (Det) (hooking) 2:44, Svoboda (Car) (high-sticking) 4:28, Wallin (Car) (roughing) 7:41, Dandenault (Det) (tripping) 12:12.
 Third period:
 Scoring: No goals.
Penalties:
Devereaux (Det) (holding the stick) 5:49, Larionov (Det) (high-sticking) 12:17, Cole (Car) (hooking) 18:19.
 First overtime:
Scoring:
5. CAROLINA FRANCIS (O'NEILL, KAPANEN) 0:58 (GWG)
Penalties:
None
Goalie statistics:
Carolina: Arturs Irbe — 23 saves / 25 shots
Detroit: Dominik Hasek — 23 saves / 26 shots
 Shots by period:
{| style="width:20em; text-align:right;"
! style="width:8em; text-align:left;" | Team
! style="width:3em;" | 1
! style="width:3em;" | 2
! style="width:3em;" | 3
! style="width:3em;" | 1OT
! style="width:3em;" | T
|-
| align="left" | Carolina || 7 || 13 || 5 || 1 || 26
|-
| align="left" | Detroit || 8 || 12 || 5 || 0 || 25
|}

Game two

Game two summary
First period:
Scoring:
1. DETROIT MALTBY (DRAPER, CHELIOS) 6:33 (SHG)
2. CAROLINA BRIND'AMOUR (unassisted) 14:47 (SHG)
Penalties:
 Draper (Det) (boarding) 1:25, Duchesne (Det) (holding) 5:21, Hill (Car) (slashing) 6:33, Svoboda (Car) (roughing) 14:03, Hill (Car) (holding) 16:23.
Second period:
Scoring: No goals.
Penalties:
Battaglia (Car) (holding) 1:05, Duchesne (Det) (tripping) 3:55, Detroit bench (too many men) 7:23, Gelinas (Car) (interference) 10:10, Ward (Car) (holding) 18:03.
 Third period:
 Scoring:
3. DETROIT LIDSTROM (FEDOROV, YZERMAN) 14:52 (PPG, GWG)
4. DETROIT DRAPER (LIDSTROM, OLAUSSON) 15:05
Penalties:
Fischer (Det) (high-sticking) 9:38, Gelinas (Car) (slashing) 14:00, Fischer (Det) (slashing) 17:15, Battaglia (Car) (charging) 17:45, Brind'Amour (Car), Cole (Car), McCarty (Det), Maltby (Det), Chelios (Det) (roughing) 19:33, Hull (Det) (tripping) 19:41.
Goalie statistics:
Carolina: Arturs Irbe — 27 saves / 30 shots
Detroit: Dominik Hasek — 16 saves / 17 shots
Shots by period:
{| style="width:20em; text-align:right;"
! style="width:8em; text-align:left;" | Team
! style="width:3em;" | 1
! style="width:3em;" | 2
! style="width:3em;" | 3
! style="width:3em;" | T
|-
| align="left" | Carolina || 7 || 4 || 6 || 17
|-
| align="left" | Detroit || 9 || 8 || 13 || 30
|}

Game three

Game three summary
First period:
Scoring:
1. CAROLINA VASICEK (GELINAS, WESLEY) 14:49
Penalties:
 Brind'Amour (Car) (holding the stick) 1:45, Hedican (Car) (boarding) 3:32, O'Neill (Car) (boarding) 11:34, Lidstrom (Det) (tripping) 12:30, Devereaux (Det) (slashing) 19:15.
Second period:
Scoring:
2. DETROIT LARIONOV (HULL) 5:33
Penalties:
Maltby (Det), Ward (Car) (unsportsmanlike conduct) 5:13, Chelios (Det) (interference) 8:12, Fedorov (Det), Hill (Car) (holding) 19:44, Hill (Car) (tripping) 13:24.
 Third period:
 Scoring:
3. CAROLINA O'NEILL (FRANCIS) 7:34
4. DETROIT HULL (LIDSTROM, FEDOROV) 18:46
Penalties:
Shanahan (Det), Vasicek (Car) (roughing) 5:25, Duchesne (Det) (holding) 9:58, Shanahan (Det), Hill (Car) (roughing) 19:01.
 First overtime:
 Scoring: No goals.
Penalties:
Duchesne (Det), Svoboda (Car) (roughing) 18:23.
 Second overtime:
 Scoring: No goals.
Penalties:
Cole (Car) (holding the stick) 8:35, Olausson (Det) (holding) 13:25.
 Third overtime:
 Scoring:
5. DETROIT LARIONOV (HOLMSTROM, DUCHESNE) 14:47 (GWG)
Penalties:
 None.
Goalie statistics:
Detroit: Dominik Hasek — 41 saves / 43 shots
Carolina: Arturs Irbe — 50 saves / 53 shots
Shots by period:
{| style="width:20em; text-align:right;"
! style="width:8em; text-align:left;" | Team
! style="width:3em;" | 1
! style="width:3em;" | 2
! style="width:3em;" | 3
! style="width:3em;" | 1OT
! style="width:3em;" | 2OT
! style="width:3em;" | 3OT
! style="width:3em;" | T
|-
| align="left" | Detroit || 6 || 7 || 16 || 11 || 6 || 7 || 53
|-
| align="left" | Carolina || 8 || 6 || 7 || 5 || 8 || 9 || 43
|}

Game four

Game four summary
First period:
Scoring: No goals.
Penalties:
 Wesley (Car) (hooking) 2:05, Fedorov (Det) (high-sticking), Cole (Car) (goaltender interference) 16:54.
Second period:
Scoring:
1. DETROIT HULL (DEVEREAUX, OLAUSSON) 6:32 (GWG)
Penalties:
Robitaille (Det) (high-sticking) 9:06, Duchesne (Det) (holding the stick) 14:34.
 Third period:
 Scoring:
2. DETROIT LARIONOV (FISCHER, ROBITAILLE) 3:43
3. DETROIT SHANAHAN (FEDOROV, CHELIOS) 14:43
Penalties:
Hill (Car) (boarding) 8:34.
Goalie statistics:
Detroit: Dominik Hasek — 17 saves / 17 shots
Carolina: Arturs Irbe — 24 saves / 27 shots
Shots by period:
{| style="width:20em; text-align:right;"
! style="width:8em; text-align:left;" | Team
! style="width:3em;" | 1
! style="width:3em;" | 2
! style="width:3em;" | 3
! style="width:3em;" | T
|-
| align="left" | Detroit ||10 || 6 || 11 || 27
|-
| align="left" | Carolina ||6 || 7 || 4 || 17
|}

Game five

Game five summary
First period:
Scoring: No goals.
Penalties:
 Carolina bench (too many men) 12:09.
Second period:
Scoring:
1. DETROIT HOLMSTROM (LARIONOV, CHELIOS) 4:07
2. DETROIT SHANAHAN (FEDOROV, YZERMAN) 14:04 (PPG, GWG)
3. CAROLINA O'NEILL (HILL, WESLEY) 18:50 (PPG)
Penalties:
Slegr (Det) (holding) 6:00, Svoboda (Car) (roughing) 13:34, Cole (Car) (roughing) 16:15, Shanahan (Det) (hooking) 16:53.
 Third period:
 Scoring:
 4. DETROIT SHANAHAN (YZERMAN) 19:15 (EN)
Penalties:
Fedorov (Det) (cross-checking) 5:23, Vasicek (Car) (interference) 8:12.
Goalie statistics:
Carolina: Arturs Irbe — 24 saves / 26 shots
Detroit: Dominik Hasek — 16 saves / 17 shots
 Shots by period:
{| style="width:20em; text-align:right;"
! style="width:8em; text-align:left;" | Team
! style="width:3em;" | 1
! style="width:3em;" | 2
! style="width:3em;" | 3
! style="width:3em;" | T
|-
| align="left" | Carolina ||5 || 7 || 5 || 17
|-
| align="left" | Detroit ||12 || 8 || 7 || 27
|}

Team rosters

Carolina Hurricanes

Detroit Red Wings

Stanley Cup engraving
The 2002 Stanley Cup was presented to Red Wings captain Steve Yzerman by NHL Commissioner Gary Bettman following the Red Wings 3–1 win over the Hurricanes in game five.

The following Red Wings players and staff had their names engraved on the Stanley Cup

2001–02 Detroit Red Wings

 10 Players (Steve Yzerman, Igor Larionov, Sergei Fedorov, Brendan Shanahan, Kris Draper, Kirk Maltby, Darren McCarty, Tomas Holmstrom, Nicklas Lidstrom, & Mathieu Dandenault) won their third Stanley Cup with Detroit.

Broadcasting
In Canada, the series was televised in English on CBC. This would end up being the last finals broadcast by SRC, as RDS would pick up the French-language broadcast for the next season.

In the United States, ESPN aired the first two games while ABC broadcast the rest of the series.

Aftermath 
The following year, the Red Wings got swept in the first round by the Mighty Ducks of Anaheim. Detroit would not return to the Finals until six years later when they defeated the Pittsburgh Penguins for their eleventh overall Stanley Cup championship. 

As for the Carolina Hurricanes, they missed the playoffs the following season. The Hurricanes would not return to the Finals until four years later when they captured their first Stanley Cup championship over the Edmonton Oilers in seven games.

Notes and references

Notes

References

 

 
Stanley Cup
Stan
Detroit Red Wings games
Stanley Cup Finals
June 2002 sports events in the United States
Ice hockey competitions in Detroit
Sports competitions in Raleigh, North Carolina
2002 in sports in Michigan
2002 in sports in North Carolina
2002 in Detroit
21st century in Raleigh, North Carolina